The Ongole Urban Development Authority (OUDA) is an urban planning agency in Prakasam district of the Indian state of Andhra Pradesh. It was constituted on 1 January 2019, under Andhra Pradesh Metropolitan Region and Urban Development Authorities Act, 2016 with the headquarters located at Ongole.

Jurisdiction 
It covers 667 villages in 39 mandals of Prakasam and Guntur districts. This 39 Mandals includes 15 villages of two Mandals of Guntur district. The below table lists the urban areas of OUDA.

References 

Prakasam district
Urban development authorities of Andhra Pradesh
State urban development authorities of India